The Gamo people are an Ethiopian ethnic group located in the Gamo Highlands of southern Ethiopia. They are found in more than 40 communities, including Chencha, Bonke, Kucha, Garbansa, Zargula, Kamba, Dorze, Birbir, Ochello, Boroda, Ganta, Gacho Baba, Eligo, Shella, Kolle, Dita, Kogo and Daramalo.

Sport
Arba Minch Town Football Club(The Crocodiles) is playing in Betking Ethiopian premier league and
Gamo Chencha Football Club(The Lions) is playing in Ethiopian Super League. Both are from Gamo zone.

History 

The name "Gamo" means lion, which refers to the group's legacy as one of the Omotic peoples. Along with the Gofa people, they gave their names to Ethiopia's former Gamo-Gofa province. Gofa broke away from the Gamo-Gofa zone in 2019.

Language 

Initially, the word Gamo was thought to be a fruit by foreigners, mainly due to the fact that the Gamo people are known for some of their fruits. The Ethiopian government eventually recognized the language in 2000 to be taught in schools.

Population 
The 2007 Ethiopian national census reported that 1,104,360 people (or 1.56% of the Ethiopian population) identified as Gamo, of whom 139,308 were urban inhabitants and 965,052 rural. However it is widely believed that the population of Gamo is considerably higher.

The Southern Nations, Nationalities, and People's Region are home to the majority of the Gamo people.

Economy 

The Gamo sell fruit in Ethiopia’s capital, Addis Ababa, including, bananas, mangos, apples, and papayas. The Gamo have developed the ability to conserve crop genetic resources while also practicing effective farming strategies. This has led them to grow over 65 varieties of barley, over 12 varieties of wheat, over 100 varieties of enset, as well as dozens of varieties of cassava, taro, and yam. Many Gamo people are weavers that make traditional clothes such as kuta, gabi, buloko, and dunguza.

Religion and history 
Originally, their belief system was rooted in traditional African religions, closely tied to nature. Today most are members of the Ethiopian Orthodox Tewahedo Church or Protestantism P'ent'ay The missionary activities of the Christians brought disturbances and tensions in their traditional society, threatening the old way of life and ecological balance.

The Gamo's strict social hierarchy offer an example of how a caste system manifests itself in material culture. Artisans, such as ground stone makers and potters, rely primarily on craft production for their livelihood.

References

Further reading 
Arthur, J. W. (2014). Culinary Crafts and Foods in Southwestern Ethiopia: An Ethnoarchaeological Study of Gamo Groundstones and Pottery. The African Archaeological Review, 31(2), 131–168. http://www.jstor.org/stable/43916695
Freeman, Dena "From Warrior to Wife: Cultural Transformation in the Gamo Highlands of Ethiopia", Journal of the Royal Anthropological Institute, 8 (2002), pp. 23–44

 Ethnic groups in Ethiopia
 Omotic-speaking peoples